Sulmazole is a cardiotonic drug. Sulmazole has the chemical formula C14H13N3O2S and a molecular weight of 287.34 g/mol.

Sulmazole has been shown to improve cardiac index and reduce pulmonary capillary wedge pressure without significant changes in a person's heart rate or arterial pressure. Sulmazole inhibits the A1 adenosine receptor and functionally blocks Gi, an inhibitory regulator. Sulmazole is also a phosphodiesterase inhibitor. Sulmazole is classified as an imidazopyridine and a sulfoxide. Sulmazole can be taken intravenously or orally. Side effects from sulmazole include blurring vision and temporary color blindness.

References 

Drugs acting on the cardiovascular system
Phosphodiesterase inhibitors
Imidazopyridines
Sulfoxides